Stadion Miejski im. Józefa Piłsudskiego, also known as Polonia Bydgoszcz Stadium, is a multi-purpose stadium in Bydgoszcz, Poland.  It is currently used mostly for speedway matches but also for association football and is the home stadium of Polonia Bydgoszcz.  The stadium has a capacity of 20,000 people and was opened in 1924 by president Stanisław Wojciechowski.

History
The stadium has hosted the Final of both the old Speedway World Team Cup in 1995 and the Speedway World Cup in 2014. It has also hosted 16 Speedway Grand Prix events including the final of the 2008 season which was actually run as the FIM Final Speedway Grand Prix. The final was to be the Speedway Grand Prix of Germany and held at the Veltins-Arena in Gelsenkirchen, however the FIM deemed that track to be unsafe due to the inclement weather (despite the Veltins-Arena sporting a retractable roof which was closed at the time the track was laid) and the GP was re-staged a week later in Bydgoszcz.

Poland's 2010 World Champion Tomasz Gollob is the most successful Grand Prix rider at the track, winning 7 of the 16 Grand Prix held in Bydgoszcz including the first GP held there, the 1998 Speedway Grand Prix of Poland.

Tomasz Gollob is the track record holder with 60.11 seconds for a 4 lap race with a clutch start. Gollob set his time on 20 June 1999.

Speedway World Finals

World Team Cup
 1995 -  Denmark (Hans Nielsen / Tommy Knudsen / Brian Karger) - 28pts

World Cup
 2014 -  Denmark (Nicki Pedersen / Peter Kildemand / Mads Korneliussen / Niels-Kristian Iversen) - 38pts

Speedway Grand Prix
 1998 Speedway Grand Prix of Poland -  Tomasz Gollob
 1999 Speedway Grand Prix of Poland II -  Hans Nielsen
 2000 Speedway Grand Prix of Europe -  Billy Hamill
 2001 Speedway Grand Prix of Poland -  Jason Crump
 2002 Speedway Grand Prix of Poland -  Tomasz Gollob
 2003 Speedway Grand Prix of Poland -  Tomasz Gollob
 2004 Speedway Grand Prix of Poland -  Tomasz Gollob
 2005 Speedway Grand Prix of Poland -  Tomasz Gollob
 2006 Speedway Grand Prix of Poland -  Nicki Pedersen
 2007 Speedway Grand Prix of Poland -  Tomasz Gollob
 2008 Speedway Grand Prix of Poland -  Greg Hancock
 2008 FIM Final Speedway Grand Prix* -  Tomasz Gollob
 2009 Speedway Grand Prix of Poland -  Nicki Pedersen
 2010 Speedway Grand Prix of Poland -  Andreas Jonsson
 2013 Speedway Grand Prix of Europe -  Emil Sayfutdinov
 2014 Speedway Grand Prix of Europe -  Krzysztof Kasprzak
* Event re-staged in Bydgoszcz due to FIM ruling the track at the Veltins-Arena in Gelsenkirchen, Germany was unsafe due to bad weather. As it was run in Poland it was renamed the "FIM Final Speedway Grand Prix".

See also

 Stadion Miejski im. Zdzisława Krzyszkowiaka, Bydgoszcz

References

!
American football venues in Poland
Buildings and structures in Bydgoszcz
Multi-purpose stadiums in Poland
Speedway venues in Poland
Sports venues in Kuyavian-Pomeranian Voivodeship
1924 establishments in Poland
Sports venues completed in 1924